David Sanchez is a French  Formula One engineer. He was formerly the Chief Engineer, Vehicle Concept at the Scuderia Ferrari Formula One team.

Career
After graduating from the École nationale supérieure de mécanique et d'aérotechnique Sanchez started his motorsport career working as an aerodynamicist for the Renault F1 team as a junior aerodynamicist in 2005.
He moved to McLaren Racing in 2007 initially as a senior aerodynamicist before progressing onto becoming an aerodynamics team leader being a part of the team that developed the innovative F-Duct seen in the McLaren MP4-25. Seeking a new challenge Sanchez decided to join Ferrari in October 2012 as a Principle Aerodynamicist, later replacing the departing Dirk de Beer as chief aerodynamicist in 2016 before heading up the entire department in 2019. In 2021 Sanchez was promoted again to Chief Engineer, Vehicle Concept leading the design and development of the 2022 Ferrari car.

References

Living people
Ferrari people
French motorsport people
Year of birth missing (living people)